Leiurus hebraeus, the Hebrew deathstalker, is a species of scorpion, a member of the family Buthidae. It is also known as the Palestinian yellow scorpion,
It was once considered as a subspecies of Leiurus quinquestriatus but recently it was elevated to the rank of a species. It is currently known from Israel, but it may live in other countries in the Middle East. Other species of the genus Leiurus are also often referred to as "deathstalkers".

Description

Geographic range
Leiurus hebraeus can be found in desert and scrubland habitats in the Middle East. Its range covers Israel and its neighboring countries. Since it was declared as a species only recently, further research is needed to determine its range.

Venom

Neurotoxins in L. quinquestriatus venom include:
 Chlorotoxin
 Charybdotoxin
 Scyllatoxin
 Agitoxins types one, two and three

Hazards
The deathstalker is one of the most dangerous species of scorpions. Its venom is a powerful mixture of neurotoxins, with a low lethal dose. While a sting from this scorpion is extraordinarily painful, it normally would not kill a healthy adult human.  However, young children, the elderly, or infirm (such as those with a heart condition and those who are allergic) are at much greater risk. Any envenomation runs the risk of anaphylaxis, a potentially life-threatening allergic reaction to the venom. A study from Israel shows a high rate of pancreatitis following envenomation. If a sting from Leiurus quinquestriatus does prove deadly, the cause of death is usually pulmonary edema.

Antivenom for the treatment of deathstalker envenomations is produced by pharmaceutical companies Twyford (German) and Sanofi Pasteur (French), and by  the Antivenom and Vaccine Production Center in Riyadh. Envenomation by the deathstalker is considered a medical emergency even with antivenom treatment, as its venom is unusually resistant to treatment and typically requires large doses of antivenom.

In the United States and other countries outside of the typical range of the deathstalker, there is the additional complicating factor that none of the existing antivenoms are approved by the Food and Drug Administration (or equivalent agencies) and are only available as investigational drugs (INDs). The US Armed Forces maintain an investigational drug application for the AVPC-Riyadh antivenom in the event of envenomation of soldiers in the Gulf War theater of operations, and the Florida Antivenin Bank maintains an IND application for Sanofi Pasteur's Scorpifav antivenom.

Uses

A component of the deathstalker's venom, the peptide chlorotoxin, has shown potential for treating human brain tumors. There has also been some evidence to show that other components of the venom may aid in the regulation of insulin and could be used to treat diabetes.

In 2015 clinical trials were beginning of the use of chlorotoxin with a fluorescent molecule attached as brain tumour "paint" (BLZ-100), to mark cancerous cells in real time during an operation. This is important in brain cancer surgery, where it is vital both to remove as many cancerous cells as possible, but not to remove healthy tissue necessary for brain functioning. In preclinical animal trials the technique  could highlight extremely small clusters of as few as 200 cancer cells, compared to the standard use of MRI, with a lower limit in excess of 500,000.

Legality
Possession of L.quinquestriatus may be  illegal or regulated in countries with laws prohibiting the keeping of dangerous animals in general. Jurisdictions are increasingly and explicitly including L.quinquestriatus in laws requiring permits to keep animals which are not usual pets,  or restricting possession of dangerous animals, and in some cases have prohibited the keeping of L.quinquestriatus save by licensed zoos and educational facilities.

In several jurisdictions departments of fish and wildlife require permits for many animals, and a number of cities and municipal governments have prohibited their possession in their bylaws.

References

External links
 Lowe G, Yagmur EA, Kovarik F. A Review of the Genus Leiurus Ehrenberg, 1828 (Scorpiones: Buthidae) with Description of Four New Species from the Arabian Peninsula. Euscorpius. 2014 (191):1-129. PDF.

Buthidae
Arthropods of Israel
Arthropods of the Middle East
Animals described in 2014